Grepstad is a Norwegian surname. Notable people with the surname include:

Jon Grepstad (born 1944), Norwegian freelance journalist, photographer, and peace activist
Ottar Grepstad (born 1953), Norwegian writer

Norwegian-language surnames